Oghab Tehran Football Club (Bashgah-e Futbal-e 'Qab Tehran) is an Iranian football team based in Tehran, Iran. They currently compete in the Tehran Province league and it is owned by the Islamic Republic of Iran Air Force.

History

Establishment & Glory Days
In the mid-1940s, Tehran slowly started becoming the football capital of Iran, and numerous great clubs emerged from there. Oghab was one of the three major teams established in Tehran in this era along with Shahin FC and Taj.

It used to be a team with a large fan base and it introduced many great players into Iranian football. For a period of time lasting from the late 1970s to the late 1980s the club did not function. After coming back, the club has spent most of its time in the lower levels of Iranian club football and has not been able to regain the spot it used to have. This continued into the new Iran Pro League era where they failed to achieve success of any kind.

Dark Years
In 2001 Oghab started competing in the newly formed Azadegan League. They finished 4th in the first season, nearly achieving promotion. Oghab's performances dropped, finishing 12th in 2004. They again had a re-emergence in 2006 when they finished 4th in Group A and nearly achieved promotion to the Iran Pro League. In the summer of 2006 Oghab shockingly sold their licence to the Shirin Faraz and competed in the Tehran Local Leagues. In 2011 Oghab made their comeback to Iranian football as they gained promotion to the 3rd Division. 2013 was the end of the line for Oghab as they were again relegated to the Local Leagues. The legacy of Oghab has long since been abandoned in Tehran as Esteghlal and Persepolis are the only supported teams in Tehran.

Season-by-Season

The table below shows the achievements of the club in various competitions.

Former Manager
  Hossein Fekri
  Mojtaba Taghavi

See also
 Hazfi Cup
 Iran Pro League

Football clubs in Tehran
Association football clubs established in 1945
1945 establishments in Iran